Armand Le Véel (1821–1905) was a French statue sculptor. He was a native of Bricquebec, in the département of Manche. Napoléon III inaugurated his equestrian tribute to Napoleon I in Cherbourg in 1858. Many of his works are on exhibition at the Beaux-arts Museum of Bordeaux. He died in Cherbourg.

References

1821 births
1905 deaths
19th-century French sculptors
French male sculptors
19th-century French male artists